Morpheis clenchi is a moth in the family Cossidae. It was described by Donahue in 1980. It is found in North America, where it has been recorded from Arizona. It is also present in northern Mexico.

Adults have been recorded on wing in July.

Etymology
The species is named in honour of Harry K. Clench.

References

Natural History Museum Lepidoptera generic names catalog

Zeuzerinae
Moths described in 1980